St. Ezekiel Moreno Dormitory is a facility of the St. Ezekiel Moreno Parish located in Macarascas, Puerto Princesa City, Palawan, Philippines, under the supervision of the Daughters of Mary, Help of Christians or known as the Salesian Sisters. The dormitory was conceptualized by then-Father Broderick Pabillo, the parish priest since May 2, 1999 with the help of a Dominican friar, Rogelio Alarcon, O.P.

History
Father Pabillo saw the hardships of students enrolled at Macarascas National High School who came from far-flung barrios striving to achieve at least a basic education. Mostly coming from very poor families, students wound up staying in poorly supervised boarding houses, and suffered from high drop-out rates and teen pregnancies.
Meeting with the Parish Pastoral Council, parents  and civic-minded individuals, requested a student dormitory. Female students were the first to be served.

Pabillo met with Father Alarcon of the Angelicum College in Quezon City and finalized a concept of an alternative learning system. It was coined REAP, or Re-Entry Education Alternative for the Poor, targeting students facing obstacles that made it difficult to impossible to finish school in a traditional way.

Today, the dormitory receives support from various non-government organizations in the country and abroad who attest to the effectiveness of the  program as it changes lives of youth in the Palawan province.

References

External links
http://www.semd-fma.org/history.html

Educational structures in the Philippines
Buildings and structures in Puerto Princesa